Dorion was a provincial electoral district in the province of Quebec, Canada.

It corresponded to the Villeray neighbourhood in Montreal.

It was created for the 1966 election from parts of Montréal-Outremont, Montréal–Jeanne-Mance and Montréal-Laurier electoral districts. Its final election was in 1989.  It disappeared in the 1994 election and its successor electoral district was Laurier-Dorion.

A Montréal-Dorion district also existed from 1912 to 1939.

The electoral district was named in honour of a prime minister of the United Province of Canada, Antoine-Aimé Dorion.

Members of the Legislative Assembly / National Assembly

Election results

External links
 Election results (National Assembly)
 Election results (QuebecPolitique.com)

Former provincial electoral districts of Quebec
Provincial electoral districts of Montreal
Villeray–Saint-Michel–Parc-Extension